Mary Isabella "May" Langrishe (1864–1939) was an Irish tennis player.

Biography 
Langrishe was born in Ireland on 31 December 1864, one of five daughters of Sir James Langrishe and his wife Adela de Blois Eccles. She was the great-great-granddaughter of Sir Hercules Langrishe. In 1879, she won the first Irish Championships at the age of 14 where she defeated Miss D. Meldon 6-2, 0-6, 8-6 in the finals. She won the singles title again in 1883 and 1886, and the doubles title with her sister Beatrice in 1884. Langrishe played at the 1885 Wimbledon Championships where she lost to Maud Watson. At her second appearance at Wimbledon in 1891, Langrishe reached the semifinals of the all-comers tournament, losing to Blanche Hillyard 4–6, 1–6. In 1882 at the Northern Championships held in Manchester she won singles title, then the doubles title with her sister Adela, and finally the mixed doubles title with William Renshaw

She died on 24 January 1939 at Hammonds Mead House, Charmouth, the same house in which Maud Watson died seven years later.

References

1864 births
1939 deaths
Irish female tennis players
British female tennis players
May